Ezequiel Santiago (April 22, 1973 – March 15, 2019) was an American politician.

Early life 
Santiago was born in Camden, New Jersey. He moved with his family to Bridgeport, Connecticut. Santiago worked on the political campaigns of his father Americo Santiago and stepfather Mitch Robles. His father also served in the Connecticut General Assembly. Ezequiel Santiago served on the Bridgeport City Council until 2008, when he ran for the open seat in the 130th district of the Connecticut House of Representatives. Santiago took office as a member of the Democratic Party in 2009, succeeding Felipe Reinoso.

Notes

1973 births
2019 deaths
Hispanic and Latino American state legislators in Connecticut
Politicians from Bridgeport, Connecticut
Politicians from Camden, New Jersey
Connecticut city council members
Democratic Party members of the Connecticut House of Representatives
21st-century American politicians